The Type 997 Artisan (Advanced Radar Target Indication Situational Awareness and Navigation) is a medium-range air and surface surveillance phased array 3D radar developed and built by BAE Systems for the United Kingdom's Royal Navy.

The Type 997 Artisan has a range of 200m –  at 30RPM and is reportedly capable of tracking more than 900 targets at once. BAE Systems state that Artisan is capable of tracking targets the size of small birds or tennis balls travelling at Mach 3 with "unrivalled detection performance and world beating electronic protection measures against even the most complex jammers".

Brazil became the second country to operate the radar, with the purchase of LPH PHM Atlântico from Royal Navy in 2018.

Operators 
List of countries that use or will use the Artisan:

  - Used on NAM Atlântico.
 - Used on its 3 Type 23 Frigates adquired from UK.

See also

S1850M radar
SAMPSON radar

References

Naval radars
Royal Navy Radar
Phased arrays